Joseph Barnes may refer to:
 Joseph Barnes (American physician) (1817–1883), Surgeon General of the United States Army
 Joseph Barnes (Irish doctor) (1914–2017), Irish physician and medical missionary
 Joseph Fels Barnes (1907–1970), American journalist
 Joseph Barnes (footballer) (1896–1953), English footballer
 Joseph Barnes (merchant) (died 1829), merchant and slave-owner in Jamaica
 Joe Barnes (born 1951), American player of Canadian football